The Last Live is an X Japan live album released on May 5, 2001. It contains what was the band's last concert, recorded at the Tokyo Dome on December 31, 1997. The band, however, has since reunited, though this was their last live concert with guitarist Hideto "hide" Matsumoto, who died nearly half a year thereafter. A DVD/VHS version was also released, titled The Last Live Video. The album reached number 7 on the Oricon chart. In 2020, Jonathan McNamara of The Japan Times listed it as one of the 10 Japanese albums worthy of inclusion on Rolling Stone's 2020 list of the 500 greatest albums of all time.

Track listing

References

External links
 , Yoshiki's official channel

X Japan live albums
2001 live albums
Albums recorded at the Tokyo Dome